Victor's Way (previously Victoria's Way), located near Roundwood, County Wicklow, Ireland, is a privately owned meditation garden notable for its black granite sculptures.  The 9-hectare property includes a number of small lakes and forested areas.

The park
The park closed in 2015 as Victoria's Way with the owner stating "Too may day-trippers came turned it into a fun park for parents with children. It was designed as a contemplative garden for over 28's." but was then re-opened under its original name Victor's Way on 15 April 2016, with new age restrictions and higher entrance fee.

The park is open to the public during the summer months. A plaque by the entrance says the park is dedicated to cryptographer Alan Turing.

Sculptures
Most of the park's statues are made of black granite, with some in bronze and range in height from 1.5m to 4.9m.  The first structure by the entrance is a sculpted tunnel based on the idea of vagina dentata. The first statue added to the park was the fasting Buddha.

Eight statues are dedicated to Ganesha, showing the elephant god dancing, reading, and playing musical instruments.  All the Ganesha sculptures were made in Tamil Nadu, India, and each took five craftsmen a year to make.

Other statues include a large python-shaped seat, a solitary index finger pointing at the sky, and interpretations of Buddha, Shiva, Eve, and others.

Many of the sculptures include small motifs of modernity, such as a small pint of Guinness beside a Ganesha and a mobile telephone tucked into the back of a starving Buddha.

Ownership
The park is owned and maintained by Victor Langheld, who was born in 1940 in Berlin and has lived with a number of different religious orders in India, Thailand, Japan, and Sri Lanka.  Family inheritance allowed Langheld to spend most of his adult life travelling to spiritual sites in Asia, before travelling to Ireland and sponsoring the construction of the sculpture park.

Langheld designed most of the sculptures, and continues to curate the park and welcome visitors.

References

External links 
 Current Official Homepage of Victor's Way
 Previous Official Homepage of Victor's Way
 Victor and his magical garden -- The Irish Independent, 2 June 2004

County Wicklow
Gardens in County Wicklow
Sculpture gardens, trails and parks in Europe